Buhid may refer to:

 The Buhid language
 The Buhid script
 Buhid (Unicode block)